Edgaras is a Lithuanian masculine given name.

Edgaras Česnauskis (born 1984), Lithuanian footballer who plays for FC Rostov
Edgaras Jankauskas (born 1975),  Lithuanian retired footballer, and a current assistant manager at FC Lokomotiv Moscow
Edgaras Mastianica (born 1988), Lithuanian professional footballer
Edgaras Stanionis (born 1988), Lithuanian professional basketball player
Edgaras Tumasonis (born 1968), Lithuanian retired football defender
Edgaras Ulanovas (born 1992), Lithuanian professional basketball player 
Edgaras Venckaitis (born 1985), Lithuanian wrestler
Edgaras Voveris (born 1967), Lithuanian orienteering competitor

Masculine given names
Lithuanian masculine given names